Peterson Occénat (born 3 December 1989 in Jérémie, Haiti) is a Haitian association football goalkeeper who currently plays for Miami United in the National Premier Soccer League.

Club career
Occénat started his professional career with Violette and then made transfers to other Port-au-Prince-based clubs Racing CH and Aigle Noir. In 2014, he emigrated to the United States to play for the fourth-tier Miami United.

International career
At the youth level he played in the 2005 CONCACAF U17 Tournament, the 2007 CONCACAF U-20 Championships and the 2008 CONCACAF Men's Pre-Olympic Tournament.

Occénat played his first senior international game with the senior national team on 5 May 2010 in and against Argentina (4–0), after he came on as a substitute for his colleague Dominique Jean-Zéphirin in the 55th minute of that game.

References

External links
 

1989 births
Living people
Association football goalkeepers
Haitian footballers
People from Jérémie
Haiti international footballers
Haitian expatriate sportspeople in the United States
Haitian expatriate footballers
Expatriate soccer players in the United States
Ligue Haïtienne players
National Premier Soccer League players
Aigle Noir AC players
Racing CH players
Violette AC players
Haiti youth international footballers